Bayport Park is a county park in Hernando County, Florida, specifically in Bayport, Florida. It sits on 7 acres adjacent to the Gulf of Mexico, directly at the end of Florida State Road 50. It contains a boardwalk, picnic pavilions, a fishing pier, and twin boat ramps.

References

Parks in Hernando County, Florida